The Kara Ahmed Pasha Mosque or Gazi Ahmed Pasha Mosque is a 16th-century Ottoman mosque near the city walls in Istanbul, Turkey. It was designed by the imperial architect Mimar Sinan and completed in around 1572.

History
The mosque was commissioned by Kara Ahmed Pasha who was married to Fatma Sultan, a daughter of Selim I. He became grand vizier under Suleiman the Magnificent in 1553 but was executed by strangulation two years later in 1555. The mosque was planned in around 1555 but only constructed between 1565 and 1571–72 after the pasha had been fully exonerated.

Architecture
The courtyard is surrounded by the cells of a medrese and a dershane, or main classroom. Attractive apple green and yellow tiles grace the porch, while blue and white ones are found on the east wall of the prayer hall. These tiles date from the mid 16th century. The  diameter dome is supported by six red granite columns. Of the three galleries, the wooden ceiling under the west one is elaborately painted in red, blue, gold and black. The mosque is last imperial building in Istanbul to be decorated with expressly designed cuerda seca tilework. Later buildings were decorated with tiles that were painted under a clear glaze.

Gallery

See also
List of Friday mosques designed by Mimar Sinan

References

Sources

External links
Kara Ahmed Pasa Kulliyesi, Archnet
Photographs of the mosque taken by Dick Osseman

Religious buildings and structures completed in 1572
Mimar Sinan buildings
Ottoman mosques in Istanbul
1554 establishments in the Ottoman Empire
16th-century mosques